Primera División de México (Mexico First Division) Apertura 2006 was the 2006 edition of La Primera División del Futbol Méxicano, crowning Mexico's autumn football champion. The season ran from August 5 to December 10, 2006. Querétaro was promoted to the Primera División de México thus, Dorados was relegated to the Primera División A. Guadalajara won the championship for a record 11th time, qualifying for the CONCACAF Champions' Cup 2007.

Overview

Final standings (groups)

League table

Top goalscorers 
Players sorted first by goals scored, then by last name. Only regular season goals listed.

Source: MedioTiempo

Results

Playoffs

Repechaje

Toluca won 2–1 on aggregate.

Guadalajara won 6–1 on aggregate.

Bracket

Quarterfinals

Toluca won 2–1 on aggregate.

Pachuca won 2–1 on aggregate.

América won 6–4 on aggregate.

Guadalajara won 4–2 on aggregate.

Semifinals

Toluca won 2–1 on aggregate.

Guadalajara won 2–0 on aggregate.

Finals

Guadalajara won 3–2 on aggregate.

2006 domestic association football leagues
Apertura